Ireland competed at the 1984 Summer Olympics in Los Angeles, It went from July 28, 1984 to August 12, 1984 United States. 42 competitors, 28 men and 13 women, took part in 35 events in 10 sports.

Medalists

Archery

In Ireland's third appearance in archery competition at the Olympics, the nation was represented by two women.  This included veteran Hazel Greene.

Women's Individual Competition:
 Hazel Greene — 2440 points (→ 20th place)
 Mary Vaughan — 2298 points (→ 39th place)

Athletics

Men's 800 metres
Marcus O'Sullivan

Men's 1,500 metres
Marcus O'Sullivan
Paul Donovan
Frank O'Mara

Men's 5,000 metres 
Ray Flynn
 Heat — 13:46.84
 Semifinals — 13:40.74
 Final — 13:34.50 (→ 11th place)

Men's 10,000 metres
 John Treacy
 Qualifying Heat — 28:18.13
 Final — 28:28.68 (→ 9th place)

Men's Marathon
 John Treacy
 Final — 2:09:56 (→  Silver Medal)

 Jerry Kiernan
 Final — 2:12:20 (→ 9th place)

 Dick Hooper
 Final — 2:24:41 (→ 51st place)

Men's 3,000 m Steeplechase
Liam O'Brien

Men's Hammer Throw 
 Declan Hegarty
 Qualification — 70.56m (→ did not advance)

 Conor McCullough
 Qualification — 65.56m (→ did not advance)

Women's 800 metres
 Caroline O'Shea

Women's 3,000 metres 
 Monica Joyce
 Heat — 8:54.34 (→ did not advance)

 Roisin Smyth
 Heat — 9.01.69 (→ did not advance)

Women's Marathon 
 Regina Joyce
 Final — 2:37:57 (→ 23rd place)

 Carey May
 Final — 2:41:27 (→ 28th place)

Women's 400m Hurdles 
 Mary Parr
 Heat — 1:01.66 (→ did not advance)

Women's Discus Throw 
 Patricia Walsh
 Qualification — 54.42m
 Final — 55.38m (→ 9th place)

Boxing

Men's Light Flyweight (– 48 kg)
Gerard Hawkins
 First Round — Bye
 Second Round — Lost to Salvatore Todisco (ITA), 0:5

Men's Bantamweight (– 54 kg)
Phillip Sutcliffe
 First Round — Bye
 Second Round — Lost to Maurizio Stecca (ITA), 0:5

Canoeing

Men's K1 1000m
Ian Pringle

Men's K1 500m
Ian Pringle

Cycling

Five cyclists represented Ireland in 1984.

Individual road race
 Martin Earley
 Paul Kimmage
 Gary Thomson
 Séamus Downey

Team time trial
 Philip Cassidy
 Martin Earley
 Paul Kimmage
 Gary Thomson

Equestrianism

Judo

Sailing

Shooting

Swimming

Women's 100m Freestyle
Carolann Heavey
 Heat — 1:01.34 (→ did not advance, 33rd place)

Women's 200m Freestyle
Carolann Heavey
 Heat — 2:06.61 (→ did not advance, 20th place)

Women's 400m Freestyle
Carolann Heavey
 Heat — 4:36.07 (→ did not advance, 22nd place)

Women's 200m Butterfly
Julie Parkes
 Heat — 2:20.85 (→ did not advance, 21st place)

References

Nations at the 1984 Summer Olympics
1984
1984 in Irish sport